Members of the sixth National Assembly were elected on 29 July 2018. The number of seats increased to 125, with Sihanoukville Province gaining two additional seats. All 125 members are solely from the Cambodian People's Party, following their landslide victory. It is the first single-party assembly since 1981, and the first since the current constitution was adopted in 1993.

Composition

List of members
 Cambodian People's Party 

Source: National Election Committee

References

Lists of political office-holders in Cambodia